Xperia Tablet (former code names Sony S1 and Sony S2), formerly known as Sony Tablet, is the brand name of a series of tablet computers. The first models originally ran Google's operating system Android 3.1 Honeycomb, but more recent models operate on the Android 4.1.2 system. The first models were informally announced on 26 April 2011, using the code names, by the Sony Corporation in the Sony IT Mobile Meeting. They featured touchscreens, two cameras (a rear-facing 5 MP, a front-facing 0.3 MP), infrared sensor, Wi-Fi. Also, they support PlayStation Suite, DLNA, and are 3G/4G compatible. The retail price in the U.S at the time of release was US$499–599. In Europe, prices were at €499. To increase the number of apps available and provide marketing support for both tablets, Sony and Adobe Systems will hold a $200,000 competition targeting app developers. The series was formally launched in Berlin and Tokyo on 31 August 2011. The latest in the series is the Xperia Z4 Tablet.

History 
On April 26, 2011, Sony announced that it would be developing two Android tablets, codenamed S1 and S2. The S1 (which became the Tablet S) was said to be "optimized for rich media entertainment" while the S2 (later Tablet P) would be "ideal for mobile communication and entertainment".

Promotional videos 
On 15 June 2011, Sony released the first in a series of five videos titled "Two Will", promoting and featuring the Tablets in an elaborately designed Rube Goldberg Machine. The episodes are entitled:

 Prologue
 The First Impression
 Going smoothly
 Filled with fun
 Together anywhere

Tablet S 

The Sony Tablet S (former code name Sony S1) has one  touchscreen display in a slate layout, and a unique wrap design inspired by the way some persons fold magazines while reading them. In landscape orientation, the unit along the top is about three times thicker than along the bottom, forming a mild slant. It was released on 11 September 2011, as the first available member of the Sony Tablet series. The suggested retail prices are $499 for the 16 GB model and $599 for the 32 GB model. In early reviews in late 2011, the units compared favorably to similar high-end tablets.

Tablet P

Xperia Tablet S 
The Xperia Tablet S was announced at Internationale Funkausstellung Berlin (IFA) 2012. It was released in the USA on September 7, 2012.  It comes in three different configurations: 16/32/64GB.  It also retains the same 9.4 inch diagonal screen size with a resolution of 1280 x 800.  However, it refined the wrap design from a wedge-shape to a more understated design.  Initial release contained firmware with Android Ice Cream Sandwich 4.0.  Sony promised to release Android Jelly Bean 4.1 some time mid-April.

Xperia Tablet Z 
The Xperia Tablet Z was announced at Mobile World Congress in January 2013.  Among major changes include a move from Tegra-based processor to the quad-core Snapdragon S4 Pro CPU, with a larger screen size of 10.1 inches and upgraded resolution of 1920 x 1200. It will come in the same 16/32/64GB configurations, and up to 64 GB in MicroSD expansion.  In addition, it will include a MHL port.

Xperia Tablet Z2 
The  Xperia Tablet Z2 was released in 2014 with 10.1-inch 1920x1200 screen and 16 GB of internal storage and 3 GB of RAM and shipped with Android 4.4 (Upgradable to 5.1). The device also supports microSD cards.

Xperia Tablet Z3 Compact 
The Xperia Tablet Z3 Compact was released in 2014 with 8.0-inch 1920x1200 screen and 16 GB of internal storage and 3 GB of RAM and shipped with Android 4.4 (Upgradable to 6.0). The device also supports microSD cards.

Xperia Z4 Tablet 
The Xperia Z4 Tablet was released in 2014 with 10.1-inch 2560x1600 screen and 32 GB of internal storage and 3 GB of RAM and shipped with Android 5.0 (Upgradable to 7.0). The device also supports microSD cards.

See also 
Comparison of tablet computers

References

External links 

 
Android (operating system) devices
Products introduced in 2011
Sony hardware
Sony products
Tablet computers